Champions is a 1984 British drama sports film based on the true story of jockey Bob Champion. It is directed by John Irvin, produced by Peter Shaw, written by Evan Jones, and stars John Hurt, Edward Woodward and Jan Francis.

Plot
The film is based on the true story of Bob Champion (portrayed by John Hurt), who was diagnosed with testicular cancer in 1979. After treatment with an operation to remove the diseased testicle and chemotherapy, Champion recovered and went on to win the 1981 Grand National on Aldaniti.

Cast
John Hurt as Bob Champion
Edward Woodward as Josh Gifford
Jan Francis as Jo Beswick
Ben Johnson as Burly Cocks
Alison Steadman as Mary Hussey
Kirstie Alley as Barbara
Ann Bell as Valda Embiricos
Peter Barkworth as Nick Embiricos 
Judy Parfitt as Dr Merrow
Michael Byrne as Richard Hussey
Aldaniti as himself

Awards
In 1984, John Irvin was nominated for the Golden Bear Award at the 34th Berlin International Film Festival.

In 1985, John Hurt won an award at the Evening Standard British Film Awards for his role in the film.

References

External links

1984 films
1984 drama films
1980s biographical drama films
1980s British films
1980s English-language films
1980s sports drama films
Biographical films about sportspeople
British biographical drama films
British horse racing films
British sports drama films
Films about cancer
Films directed by John Irvin
Films scored by Carl Davis
Embassy Pictures films